Adélaïde Chabannes de Balsac, known professionally by her stage name Adé, born April 20, 1995, is a French singer-songwriter, musician and music executive.

Biography 
Adé was the lead singer of the band Therapie Taxi, from their début in 2013, until their disbanding in 2021. She released several albums with them, most notably Hit Sale. Outside of the group, she also engaged in collaborations: with Benjamin Biolay, notably for the song Parc fermé (2021), with Nolwenn Leroy for the album La Cavale (2021) as well as with Louane for the song Pleure (2020).

She started a solo career in 2022. That April, she released her first single: Tout savoir. She released her début album Et alors? on September 23, 2022.

Tout savoir reached number 5 on the French Singles charts on October 2, 2022. The song had an accompanying music video, released on YouTube, which was directed by Stéphane Barbato and produced in collaboration with Warner Chappell Music France. As of February 2023, the video had received over six million views.

She has stated that her music is inspired by that of artists such as Cat Power, Elvis Presley, and Neil Young.

Discography

Studio albums 
 2022: Et alors?

Singles 

 "Tout savoir" released 19 April 2022 – peaked at No. 5
 "Sunset" released 24 August 2022
 "Q" released 23 September 2022

References 

French women singers
1995 births
Living people